Libya sent a delegation of 81 athletes to the 2009 Mediterranean Games. These athletes won a total of 1 gold medal and 6 bronze medals.

Nations at the 2009 Mediterranean Games
2009
Mediterranean Games